The Pragmatic Sanction of 1830, issued on  by King Ferdinand VII of Spain, ratified a Decree of 1789 by Charles IV of Spain, which had replaced the semi-Salic system established by Philip V of Spain with the mixed succession system that predated the Bourbon monarchy (see also Carlism).

When  Philip V, from the French Bourbon acceded to the Spanish throne in the Spanish War of Succession, he brought with him the Salic law, which restricted succession to the throne to the direct male line. However, King Ferdinand VII of Spain had fathered only two daughters, Isabella and Luisa Ferdinand of Bourbon. Ferdinand's father, Charles IV of Spain made a weak attempt to eliminate the Salic Law, and Ferdinand brought forth the Pragmatic Sanction of 1830, so that his oldest daughter would inherit the throne and be declared queen upon his death, as was the Spanish custom.

This removed his brother, Infante Carlos, Count of Molina, as the next in the line of succession under Salic Law. Charles' supporters, among whom was Francisco Calomarde, pressured Ferdinand VII to repeal the Pragmatic Sanction. As she was still a minor, the kingdom fell under the regency of her mother Maria Christina of the Two Sicilies.

References

1830 in Spain
19th century in Spain
Carlism
Succession acts